Vives is the fifteenth studio album by Colombian singer Carlos Vives, released on November 10, 2017 through Sony Music Latin. The album was produced by Vives alongside Andrés Castro and features collaborations with singers such as Sebastián Yatra, Shakira, Thalía and Cynthia Montaño, among others.

At the 19th Annual Latin Grammy Awards, the album won Best Contemporary Tropical Album, the fourth time Vives had won the category, while the song "Robarte un Beso" was nominated for Song of the Year. Additionally, the song "La Bicicleta" won both Record of the Year and Song of the Year two years prior at the 17th Annual Latin Grammy Awards.

The album also received nominations for Best Latin Pop Album at the 61st Annual Grammy Awards and for Tropical Album of the Year at the 2018 Billboard Latin Music Awards.

Singles
The song "La Bicicleta" was released as the album's first single on May 27, 2016. The song was commercially successful peaking at number two in the Hot Latin Songs and at 95 in the Billboard Hot 100 chart, being the first and only entry to the latter chart by Vives. The single was followed by "Al Filo de tu Amor" on January 23, 2017, a remix for the song with Puerto Rican artist Wisin was released on March 24, 2017. 

The track "Robarte un Beso" with Sebastián Yatra was released as the third single for the album on July 28, 2017, the song was also included in Yatra's debut studio album Mantra.

Track listing

Charts

Certifications

References

External links
Official Website

2017 albums
Carlos Vives albums
Latin Grammy Award for Best Contemporary Tropical Album
Sony Music Latin albums